Cisco Grove is an unincorporated community in Placer County, California. Cisco Grove is located 7 miles (11.3 km) east of Emigrant Gap.  It lies at an elevation of 5643 feet (1720 m).

As of 2016, its population is 81.

References

Unincorporated communities in California
Unincorporated communities in Placer County, California